André Myhrer (born 11 January 1983) is a retired Swedish World Cup alpine ski racer and Olympic gold medalist. Born at Bergsjö in Gävleborg County, Myhrer competed in the technical events and specialised in slalom.

Career
Myhrer made his World Cup debut in January 2004 and his first victory came at Beaver Creek, Colorado, in December 2006. Myhrer represented Sweden at the 2006 Winter Olympics and tied for fourth place in the slalom, only 0.03 s from third. At the 2010 Olympics he was tenth after the first run of the slalom at Whistler, then had the fastest time in the second and won the bronze medal.  In 2018, Myhrer won the Olympic slalom competition after both main favourites had failed to finish. In addition to four Olympics, Myhrer has competed in nine World Championships.

In his career, Myhrer has eight World Cup victories and 30 podiums, 22 in slalom and 8 in parallel races. He won the 2012 season title in slalom and finished eleventh in the overall standings.

He was awarded the Hälsingland Golden Award in 2005, 2012 och 2018.

World Cup results

Season titles

Season standings

Race podiums
 8 wins – (7 SL, 1 PS)
 30 podiums – (23 SL, 6 PS, 1 PG)

World Championship results

Olympic results

Video
youtube.com – Myhrer wins at Levi – 11 November 2012

References
Data at eurosport.fr

External links

André Myhrer World Cup standings at the International Ski Federation

Swedish Olympic Committee (SOK) – André Myhrer
Head.com – athletes – alpine skiing – André Myhrer
 

1983 births
Swedish male alpine skiers
Alpine skiers at the 2006 Winter Olympics
Alpine skiers at the 2010 Winter Olympics
Alpine skiers at the 2014 Winter Olympics
Alpine skiers at the 2018 Winter Olympics
Olympic alpine skiers of Sweden
Medalists at the 2010 Winter Olympics
Medalists at the 2018 Winter Olympics
Olympic medalists in alpine skiing
Olympic gold medalists for Sweden
Olympic bronze medalists for Sweden
FIS Alpine Ski World Cup champions
Swedish expatriates in Monaco
People from Nordanstig Municipality
Living people
Sportspeople from Gävleborg County
21st-century Swedish people